The 2011–12 West Virginia Mountaineers men's basketball team represented West Virginia University during the 2011–12 NCAA Division I men's basketball season. The Mountaineers, led by fifth year head coach Bob Huggins, played their home games at WVU Coliseum and were members of the Big East Conference. They finished the season 19–14, 9–9 in Big East play to finish in eighth place. They lost in the second round of the Big East Basketball tournament to Connecticut. They received an at-large bid to the 2012 NCAA basketball tournament where they lost in the second round to Gonzaga.

Roster

Schedule

|-
!colspan=9| Regular season

|-
!colspan=9| 2012 Big East men's basketball tournament 

|-
!colspan=9| 2012 NCAA tournament

|-

References

West Virginia Mountaineers men's basketball seasons
West Virginia
West Virginia
West Virginia Mountaineers men's basketball
West Virginia Mountaineers men's basketball